Chest Creek is a tributary of the West Branch Susquehanna River in Cambria County and Clearfield County, in Pennsylvania, in the United States. Although it is considered by the Pennsylvania Department of Environmental Protection to be impaired by situation, it is a coldwater fishery or a high-quality coldwater fishery throughout its length.

Course
Chest Creek begins in a valley in Allegheny Township, Cambria County. It flows north for several miles to Bradley Junction, where its valley widens and it turns northeast. The creek picks up the tributary Laurel Lick Run and eventually turns north again and flows along the border between East Caroroll Township and Clearfield Township. It eventually reaches the community of Patton, where it picks up the tributary Little Chest Creek and turns north-northwest, flowing along the border between Chest Township and Elder Township. After a number of miles, the creek receives the tributaries Rock Run and Brubaker Run. A short distance downstream, it leaves Cambria County.

Upon leaving Cambria County, Chest Creek enters Westover Borough, Clearfield County. In this township, the creek turns northeast, picking up Rougues Harbor Run and Ashcraft Run. It then passes by the community of Westover. The creek enters Chest Township, Clearfield County and starts meandering. It crosses once and flows parallel to Pennsylvania Route 36 for a number of miles and receives the tributaries Pine Run, Spring Run, Kings Run, Snyder Run, and North Camp Run. The creek eventually passes through the community of Newburg, where it receives Wilson Run and Rattling Run. It then enters Bell Township and turns northwest, flowing parallel to Pennsylvania Route 36. A few miles later, it passes through Mahaffey and reaches its confluence with the West Branch Susquehanna River.

Tributaries
Tributaries of Chest Creek include Ashcraft Run, Brubaker Run, and Duclos Run.

Hydrology

Geography, geology, and climate

There are strainers throughout the length of Chest Creek. Additionally, there are two dams on the creek in its upper reaches. The creek flows through a canyon in its middle reaches.

The main stem of Chest Creek is in the Appalachian Plateaus physiographic province.

Watershed

Fifty-seven percent of the watershed of the main stem of Chest Creek is forested land. Thirty-seven percent of this part of the watershed is agricultural land, and 6 percent has other uses.

Biology
Most of Chest Creek (the entire length of the creek between its mouth and Patton) is designated as a coldwater fishery. The creek's headwaters are designated as a high-quality coldwater fishery.

Recreation
The difficulty rating of the creek is between 1 and 3. Edward Gertler describes the scenery along it as between poor and good, depending on the location. The creek is the first major tributary of the West Branch Susquehanna River that it is possible to canoe on.

See also
List of rivers of Pennsylvania

References

Rivers of Pennsylvania
Tributaries of the West Branch Susquehanna River
Rivers of Cambria County, Pennsylvania
Rivers of Clearfield County, Pennsylvania